Each winner of the 1990 Governor General's Awards for Literary Merit received $10000 and a specially bound edition of his or her book.  The winners were selected by a panel of judges administered by the Canada Council for the Arts.

English Language

Fiction

Winner:
Nino Ricci, Lives of the Saints

Other Finalists:
Sky Lee, Disappearing Moon Café 
Alice Munro, Friend of My Youth 
Leslie Hall Pinder, On Double Tracks 
Diane Schoemperlen, Man of My Dreams

Poetry
Winner:
Margaret Avison, No Time

Other Finalists:
Dionne Brand, No Language Is Neutral 
Patrick Lane, Winter

Drama
Winner:
Ann-Marie MacDonald, Goodnight Desdemona (Good Morning Juliet)

Other Finalists:
Audrey Butler, Black Friday? 
John Mighton, Scientific Americans 
George F. Walker, Love and Anger

Non-fiction
Winner:
Stephen Clarkson & Christina McCall, Trudeau and Our Times

Other Finalists:
Timothy Findley, Inside Memory: Pages from a Writer's Workbook 
Eugene Forsey, A Life on the Fringe: The Memoirs of Eugene Forsey 
Ron Graham, God's Dominion: A Sceptic's Quest 
James King, The Last Modern: A Life of Herbert Read

Children's Literature – Text
Winner:
Michael Bedard, Redwork

Other Finalists:
Jan Andrews, The Auction 
Brian Doyle, Covered Bridge 
Welwyn Wilton Katz, Whale Singer

Children's Literature – Illustration
Winner:
Paul Morin, The Orphan Boy

Other Finalists:
Warabé Aska, Seasons 
Frances Tyrrell, The Huron Carol

Translation (from French to English)
Winner:
Jane Brierley, Yellow-Wolf and Other Tales of the Saint Lawrence

Other Finalists:
Patricia Claxton, Letters to Bernadette 
Sheila Fischman, Benito
Anthony Martin-Sperry, Charlevoix: Two Centuries at Murray Bay 		  
Susan Usher, Community Care and Participatory Research

French Language

Fiction

Winner:
Gérald Tougas, La Mauvaise foi

Other Finalists:
Louis Lefebvre, Le Collier d'Hurracan 
Michèle Mailhot, Le Passé composé 
Jean Marcel, Jérôme ou de la traduction 
France Vézina, Osther, le chat criblé d'étoiles

Poetry
Winner:
Jean-Paul Daoust, Les Cendres bleues

Other Finalists:
Geneviève Amyot, Corps d'atelier 
André Brochu, Dans les chances de l'air 
Denise Desautels, Leçons de Venise
Joël Des Rosiers, Tribu

Drama
Winner:
Jovette Marchessault, Le Voyage magnifique d'Emily Carr

Other Finalists:
René-Daniel Dubois, Le Troisième fils du professeur Yourolov 	  
Anne Hébert, L'Île de la Demoiselle

Non-fiction
Winner:
Jean-François Lisée, Dans l'oeil de l'aigle

Other Finalists:
Gérard Bergeron, Petit traité de l'État de France''' 
Martin Blais, L'Autre Thomas d'Aquin 
Daniel Latouche, Le Bazar 
Laurent-Michel Vacher, L'Empire du moderneChildren's Literature – Text
Winner:
Christiane Duchesne, La Vraie histoire du chien de Clara VicOther Finalists:
José Fréchette, L'Automne à 15 ans 
Philippe Gauthier, L'Héritage de Qader 
Johanne Massé, Le Passé en périlChildren's Literature – Illustration
Winner:
Pierre Pratt, Les Fantaisies de l'oncle HenriOther Finalists:
Mireille Levert, Jérémie et Mme Ming, 
Stéphane Poulin, Les Amours de ma mère,

Translation (from English to French)

Winner:
Charlotte et Robert Melançon, Le Second rouleauOther Finalists:
Claire Dupond, Lettres à un ami québécois 
Ivan Steenhout, Onyx John''

Governor General's Awards
Governor General's Awards
Governor General's Awards